Michael Schiniou, known professionally by his stage name Jazzy M, is a British DJ and record producer. He was highly influential role in introducing house music to Britain in the 1980s and has been described as the Godfather of UK House (a nickname given to him by fellow DJ Grooverider).

Schiniou has also released music and performed under the pseudonyms Klubzone 1, Sao Paulo, Dub Nation, Zoogie, Erotic World, J+M Connection, RipJazz, Bernard and Phillip, JZJ, and Bushbaby.

Biography

Early life 
Schiniou was born in London in 1962.

He studied at Kingston University.

Career 
Schiniou began his professional interest in music after taking a weekend job in record shop Shady Deals. He has described being influenced by funk, disco, jazz, and soul music in his teens.

He began DJing aged 17. His first radio spot was on pirate radio station Radio Fulham, at that time performing as DJ Mick.

In the mid-1980s Schiniou began hosting The Jackin' Zone on pirate LWR, possibly the first dedicated electronic and house music programme on UK radio.

Jazzy M was the first DJ to play at the Ministry of Sound nightclub, going on to be resident DJ there for a record 15 years.

He has worked in, run, or owned a number of record shops over the years, including Spin Offs, Vinyl Zone.

Later in his career, Schiniou turned to record production, running labels OhZone, Delphinus Delphius, Red Giant Recordings, Spanklin Records, Le Plug Rouge, and Who Killed Disco?. In this capacity he launched the careers of the likes of Orbital.

References 

British DJs
British record producers
1962 births
Living people